Barkley may refer to:

People
Barkley (surname), people with this name

Places
Barkley, Delaware, an unincorporated community in New Castle County, Delaware, United States
Barkley Township, Jasper County, Indiana, in the United States
Barkley, Missouri, an unincorporated community
Barkley Valley, British Columbia, former gold-mining community and ghost town
Lake Barkley, a large man-made lake in the Western region of the U.S. State of Kentucky and named for Vice-President and Kentucky native Alben Barkley

Other uses
Barkley Shut Up and Jam!, a 1993 video game 
Barkley Inc., a U.S. advertising company
Barkley Marathons, an ultramarathon race in Tennessee
Barkley (Sesame Street), a dog character on Sesame Street
Gnarls Barkley, an American musical collaboration started in 2003
The Barkleys, an American animated television series that ran from 1972 to 1973

See also
Barclay (disambiguation)
Barkly (disambiguation)
Berkeley (disambiguation)
Berkley (disambiguation)
Berklee College of Music